Yarskoy 1-y is a rural locality (a khutor) in Sulyayevskoye Rural Settlement, Kumylzhensky District, Volgograd Oblast, Russia. The population was 472 as of 2010. There are 20 streets.

Geography 
Yarskoy 1-y is located in forest steppe, on Khopyorsko-Buzulukskaya Plain, on the bank of the Kumylga River, 18 km north of Kumylzhenskaya (the district's administrative centre) by road. Nikitinsky is the nearest rural locality.

References 

Rural localities in Kumylzhensky District